Jeremy McGrath Supercross '98 is a racing video game developed by Atod (A&D) and Probe Entertainment and published by Acclaim Entertainment under their Acclaim Sports banner exclusively for PlayStation. It was licensed to use the name and likeness of Supercross champion Jeremy McGrath.

The game allows two-player racing via a split screen. Players can create their own custom bike and custom tracks, which can be saved to a memory card.

Reception

The game received "mixed" reviews according to the review aggregation website GameRankings.

Notes

References

External links
 

1998 video games
Acclaim Entertainment games
Motorcycle video games
Off-road racing video games
PlayStation (console) games
PlayStation (console)-only games
Video games developed in Sweden
Video games developed in the United Kingdom